Jesús Carles de Vilallonga i Rosell  (1927, Santa Coloma de Farners, Spain – 2018, Barcelona, Spain) was a Spanish/Canadian figurative artist who worked primarily in the medium of egg tempera. He is best known for his richly textured paintings in an intricate, highly colored style that is not easy even though everything is readily intelligible: male and females characters, beasts, forests, architectural structures and artifacts.  Vilallonga's iconography draws from a broad and complex painting tradition ranging from Romanesque art, the Renaissance, and Surrealism, while maintaining his own contemporary style. His work is sometimes related to Symbolism and his production is always enhanced by the contributions of abstraction.  He works with the "inner eye" which Freud described as the most profound and the most intelligent, in a sojourn through nature and man's hidden interior.

Vilallonga exhibited widely in Europe, Canada, and the United States and his oeuvre includes bronze and resin sculpture, watercolor paintings, design objects, and different print mediums including screen print, etching, lithography, and digital art. He was awarded the National Order of Québec in 2011  and Fill Predilecte in Santa Coloma de Farners, Spain in 2015.

Life and career 
The fourth child of Salvador de Vilallonga i Corominas and Maria Dolors Rosell i Planes de Farners, Jesús Carles Isidre de Vilallonga i Rosell was born on March 10, 1927.  His father was a wealthy landowner whose family documents, now deposited in the Arxiu Comarcal de la Selva, date back to the 13th century.  His parents were patrons of the arts and often had artists vacation at their summer home, the 15th-century family estate Mas Parés located in the village of Sant Martí Sapresa.  At the age of five, Vilallonga made his first drawings there alongside the Catalan impressionist painter Joaquim Mir. 

The Spanish Civil War  (1936–1939) shattered the family's bucolic lifestyle.  When Vilallonga was eleven years old, his father, Salvador de Vilallonga, who had been in hiding during much of the war, first in a secret part of the house, then later in artist's studio in Barcelona, was killed when he tried to cross over to France through the Pyrenees. Maria Dolors, with her eight children, left Santa Coloma de Farners and relocated to an apartment in Girona.
In 1948, Vilallonga moved to Barcelona, where he studied drawing along with Joan Ponç at Ramón Rogent’s studio and took architecture classes at the University of Barcelona. Convinced that he wanted to dedicate his life to being an artist, he continued to exhibit and win prizes for his watercolor paintings, painted frescos in two different chapels, designed murals and mosaics for a large hotel on the Mediterranean coast, and studied painting with Marcel Gromaire at the École des Beaux-Arts in Paris.  He traveled throughout Europe, stopping in Rome to visit his friend the painter Jaume Muxart, and finally ended up in Copenhagen, selling his recently painted watercolors in the squares of major cities along the way to pay his expenses.

In 1954, he accepted a mural commission in Montréal and that move proved decisive to his art career.  To cover his expenses, he had the ingenious idea of painting watercolors of the wealthy homes in Westmount and selling the paintings to their owners. He sang and played the guitar in clubs, designed the costumes and set designs for a ballet at the National Ballet of Canada, and briefly taught Spanish at the Université de Montréal.

In 1958, Vilallonga signed an exclusive contract with Max Stern, owner of the prestigious Dominion Gallery in Montréal, who was responsible for introducing the contemporary European artists Henry Moore, Marino Marini, Van Dongen and Picabia in Canada.  His early paintings were in oil in an expressionistic style, alongside his trademark egg tempera paintings on board. Vilallonga’s contract with the gallery continued for thirty years until the death of Stern.

Vilallonga married his first wife Madeleine Kirouac, a Canadian widow with two young daughters Manon and Lyzanne Alain, in 1959 and they had two more daughters Marta and Salvana. Vilallonga continued to paint prolifically while dividing his time between Cadaqués, Montréal, and Barcelona.  In 1982, Vilallonga met Katherine Slusher, an American writer and art historian living in Barcelona. They were married in Saint-Jérôme, Quebec in 1989.

In 1992, they spent a year in Syracuse, New York, where Vilallonga studied sculpture under Rodger Mack and produced several bronze and aluminum sculptures at the Syracuse University foundry.  The couple returned to Barcelona where Vilallonga worked for the next twenty years at his two studios in the Raval and became integrated in the social milieu of the Ramblas.  The last five years of his life, he worked on large scale drawings at their home, until his death in 2018.

Jesús Carles de Vilallonga’s paintings, sculptures, prints, and drawings are the subject of numerous books and documentaries and are in museums, universities, and private collections throughout the world. His extensive body of work has been exhibited in individual exhibitions at the Lefevre Gallery in London, Sagittarius Gallery in New York, Galería Juana Mordó in Madrid, Art Contemporain in Paris, Dau al Set in Barcelona, and multiple galleries in Canada. Retrospectives of his work were held at the Thousand Oaks Civic Arts Plaza in California in 2000, the Parisian Laundry in Montréal in 2006, and the Museu Casa de la Paraula in Spain in 2015.  The Université de Montréal and Concordia University  house large public works by Vilallonga.
All of the documentation on Vilallonga's long and prolific career – exhibition catalogs, brochures, press reviews, magazine articles, publications, and over 3,000 photographs of his work – are available for consultation at the Arxiu in Santa Coloma de Farners.

Selected exhibitions 
2020•  Vilallonga, The Inner Eye, Espai Volart, Barcelona, Spain
2015•  Painting Retrospective/Recent Drawings - Museu Centre Cultural Casa de la Paraula, Santa Coloma de Farners, Spain
2009•	Galeria Article, Barcelona, Spain    •Sala Joan Vinyoli, Santa Coloma de Farners
2007•	Galerie Gala, Montréal, Canada
2006•	Parisian Laundry, Montréal, Canada
2005•	Installation Ceremony: Imaginary Portrait of 24 Universal Geniuses of Today, Concordia University, Montréal, Canada              •Galeria Uranga, Bilbao, Spain
2004•	Galerie Gala, Montréal, Canada
2003•	Galeria Uranga, Bilbao, Spain    •Galeria Article 26, Barcelona, Spain
2002•	Photokina, Cologne, Germany    •Galerie Gala, Montréal, Canada    •Galeria Expoart, Girona, Spain
2001•	Galerie Madeleine Lacerte, Québec, Canada
2000•	Retrospective Exhibition: Poetic Symbolism from Barcelona, Civic Arts Plaza, Thousand Oaks, California   •Galeria Article 26, Barcelona, Spain
1999•	Galeria Article 26, Barcelona    •Galerie d’Art du Mont-Sainte-Anne, Beaupré, Canada    •Galerie Sous Le Passe-Partout, Montréal, Canada
1998•	Galerie Gala, Trois-Rivières, Canada    •Château Laurier, Ottawa
1997•	Galeria d’Art Farners, Santa Coloma de Farners, Spain
1996•	Galerie de Bellefeuille, Montréal, Canada    •Galeria Ferlandina, Barcelona    •Galeria Expoart, Girona, Spain
1995•	Galerie d'art Jean-Claude Bergeron, Ottawa    •Galerie d'art Vincent, Château Laurier, Ottawa    •Fundació Vilallonga, Sant Marti Sapresa, Spain    •Galerie d’Art du Mont-Sainte-Anne, Beaupré, Canada    •Galerie Gala, Trois-Rivières

Museum and public collections 
Musée des Beaux-Arts de Montréal, Canada
Musée d’Art Contemporain, Montréal
Bibliothèque Nationale de Paris, France
Biblioteca Nacional de España, Madrid, Spain
Université de Montréal
Musée national des beaux-arts du Québec 
Museu Nacional d’Art de Catalunya, Barcelona
Fundació Vila Casas, Barcelona
Syracuse University Art Collection, New York
University of Toronto Art Center, Toronto
Bibliothèque Nationale du Canada, Ottawa
Fundació La Caixa, Col.lecció Testimoni, Barcelona
Musée de l’Université de Sherbrooke, Québec
Château Saint Fargeau, Yonne, France
Richards Gallery, Northeastern University, Boston
Art Gallery of Hamilton, Canada
Art Gallery of Greater Victoria, Canada
Edmonton Art Gallery, Canada
Palau Fontana d’Or, Girona, Spain
Kitchener-Waterloo Art Gallery, Canada
Museu de Cadaqués, Spain
Concordia University, Montréal
Bronfman Collection, Montréal

Publications 
Vilallonga, The Inner Eye, Espai Volart, Barcelona, 2020 
Jesús de Vilallonga, Drawings, Symbols and Signs, Museu Casa de la Paraula, Santa Coloma de Farners, 2015  
Vull Inventar Jesús Vilallonga, Ajuntament de Santa Coloma de Farners, 2015  
Cent anys de pintura a Cadaqués, Tharrats, Joan Josep, Parsifal Edicions, Barcelona, 2007  
Vilallonga, Parisian Laundry, Montréal, Québec, 2006
Livre d' Heures, Vilallonga, Jesús de, Editions Leméac, Montréal, 2005  
Le regard des mots, Vigneault, Gilles et Vilallonga, J.C. de, Ed. Broquet, Montréal, Québec, 2005 
Salvador Dalí en el seu entorn de Cadaqués, Keeler, Tony, Ed. Ajuntament de Cadaqués, Catalunya, 2004 
Vilallonga: Poetic Symbolism from Barcelona, Thousand Oaks, California, 2000 .
Vilallonga: Les lieux du rêve / Cloister of Dreams, De Moura Sobral, Luís Editions Broquet (bilingual edition), Montréal, 1993  
J.C. Vilallonga: Poet of Inner Vision, Spicer, Malcolm Editorial Juventud, Barcelona, 1978
Surréalisme Català, Galeria Dau al Set, Barcelona, 1976
Vilallonga, Descharnes, Robert Editorial Juventud (French and English editions), Barcelona, 1971

Films 
Documentary, series Carte Blanche-Portraits culturels, Vilallonga artiste peintre, Radio-Quebec Television, 56 min., 1995 CVE - Jesús Carles de Vilallonga — artiste peintre
Jesús Carles de Vilallonga – Fondre l'art, Radio-Quebec Television, 28 min., 1997 CVE - Jesús Carles de Vilallonga — Fondre l'art

 Livre d'Artiste Sur L'îlot De Cupidon, Péloquin, Claude, Vilallonga, Jesús de,  Montréal, 2007Terre de Femme, Péloquin, Claude, Vilallonga, J.C.,  Montréal, 2005Rencontre, Vigneault, Gilles, Vilallonga, Jesús de,  Québec, 2003Soleil-Soleil'', Péloquin, Claude, Vilallonga, Jesús de,  Montréal, 1996

Links 
2020 Barcelona Exhibition 
2015 Drawings 
Art Work  
Exhibition Photographs 
Vilallonga Family in Images

References 

1927 births
2018 deaths
Artists from Catalonia
People from Santa Coloma de Farners
People from Barcelona